The 1932 Perserikatan season was the third season of the Indonesian Perserikatan football competition since its establishment in 1930. Voetbalbond Indies Jakarta (V.I.J.) is the defending champions won his second league title.

It was contested by 3 teams and the first season competition was organised under the Persatuan Sepakbola Seluruh Indonesia (PSSI). PSIM Yogyakarta won the championship.

Final tournament

Results

References

External links
P.S.S.I. (inlandsche) Stedenwedstrĳden 1930-1950

1932 in Asian football
1932 in association football
1932 in the Dutch East Indies
Seasons in Indonesian football competitions
Sport in the Dutch East Indies
1932 in Dutch sport